Gotti Made-It is a collaborative commercial mixtape by American rapper Yo Gotti and American record producer Mike WiLL Made-It. It was released on June 1, 2017.

Track listing

Personnel
 Yo Gotti – primary artist
 Make WiLL Made-It – primary artist, producer
 Nicki Minaj – featured artist
 Pluss – producer
 Scooly – producer
 30 Roc – producer
 TL On The Beat – producer
 Resource – producer
 Blue Cheeze – producer
 Leo Goff – mixer
 Steve "The Sauce" Hybicki – mixer

Charts

References

External links
 

2017 albums
Mike Will Made It albums
Yo Gotti albums
Albums produced by Mike Will Made It
Self-released albums